Burke County Courthouse may refer to:

 Burke County Courthouse (Georgia), Waynesboro, Georgia
 Burke County Courthouse (North Carolina), Morganton, North Carolina
 Burke County Courthouse (North Dakota), Bowbells, North Dakota